The Methos Chronicles is a 2001 animated internet Flash series based on Methos, a character drawn from Highlander: The Series. Peter Wingfield was the voice actor for the main character of the short series, which lasted only one eight-episode season. The animation quality was considered by most to be poor, but it has found something of a cult following amongst die-hard Highlander fans. The Chronicles had eight flash animated episodes, and most of the episodes contained flashbacks of Ancient Egypt. The series was left incomplete in 2001, but new fan-made episodes complete the story with an additional 8 episodes.

Narration
The narration was given by Wingfield as Methos himself, sometimes given in each episodes:
"I've died, been reborn a thousand times and died again. But in the 5000 years that I've been alive, I've rarely thought back to the beginning and the secrets I buried there. Unfortunately, secrets never die when you're immortal..."

List of episodes

See also
List of Highlander characters

References

External links
 
 The Methos Chronicles - Playlist on YouTube

Highlander (franchise)
Animated web series
Television spin-offs
2001 web series debuts
2001 web series endings